The former government of Alexei Kosygin was dissolved following his resignation in October 1980. Nikolai Tikhonov took over the office of the Premier. The government was dissolved following the nationwide 1984 legislative election.

Ministries

Committees

References
General

Government of the Soviet Union > List
 

Specific

1980 establishments in the Soviet Union
1984 disestablishments
Era of Stagnation
Soviet governments